Kristala Jones Prather is an American professor of Chemical Engineering at the Massachusetts Institute of Technology. Her research is focused on using novel bioprocesses to design of recombinant microorganisms for the production of small molecules.

Early life and education 
Prather was born in Cincinnati. She grew up in Longview, Texas. She was inspired to study chemical engineering by her physics and calculus teachers. She earned a Bachelor of Science from Massachusetts Institute of Technology in 1994. She has been involved with the National Society of Black Engineers and National Organization for the Professional Advancement of Black Chemists and Chemical Engineers. She completed her PhD at University of California, Berkeley, graduating in 1999.

Research and career 
Prather worked at BioProcess R&D and the Merck & Co. labs for four years, working on biocatalysis for the transformation of small molecules and mammalian cell lines for therapeutic proteins. This allowed her to produce drugs with biological processes rather than chemical reactions. She was appointed to the faculty of Massachusetts Institute of Technology in 2004. In 2009, her team created a glucaric acid from Escherichia coli which contained enzymes from three organisms.

In 2014 she was appointed a Fellow Radcliffe Institute for Advanced Study. Today she is an investigator in the multi-institutional Synthetic Biology Engineering Research Center, as well as leader of the Prather lab. She specialises in retrobiosynthesis. These pathways use synthetic DNA, which can be added biological hosts. She has given expert evidence to the National Academy of Sciences on vulnerabilities in biodefense.

Prather is well known for her teaching, mentoring and advocacy. She was profiled on Spellbound, how kids become scientists. Prather is on the advisory board of the Woodrow Wilson International Center for Scholars SynBio Project. She is involved with several initiatives to support students of colour on campus at Massachusetts Institute of Technology.

Prather was a reviewer for the ACS synthetic biology (2016, 2018) and for the Journal of the American Chemical Society (2016,2017).

Selected publications 

 Dinh C.V., Chen X., Prather K.L.J. (2020) Development of a Quorum-Sensing Based Circuit for Control of Coculture Population Composition in a Naringenin Production System. ACS Synth Biol.
 Doong S.J., Gupta A. and K.L.J. Prather (2018) Layered dynamic regulation for improving metabolic pathway productivity in Escherichia coli. Proc. Natl. Acad. Sci. U S A 115(12):2964-2969.
 Fox, K.J. and K.L.J. Prather.  2020. “Production of D-glyceric acid from D-galacturonate in Escherichia coli.” J. Ind. Microbiol. Biotechnol. 47:1075–1081.

Honors and awards 
2005 - Office of Naval Research Young Investigator award

2007 - Technology Review “TR35” Young Innovator Award

2018 - Massachusetts Institute of Technology Seed Grant

2010 - National Science Foundation CAREER Award

2010 - Massachusetts Institute of Technology School of Engineering Junior Bose Award for Excellence in Teaching

2011 - Biochemical Engineering Journal Young Investigator Award

2012 - World Economic Forum Annual Meeting of the New Champions

2014 - Massachusetts Institute of Technology MacVicar Faculty Fellow

2017 - Society for Industrial Microbiology and Biotechnology Charles Thom Award

2017 - Martin Luther King Jr. Leadership Award

2018 - AAAS Fellow

2021 - Gordon Y. Billard Award

2021 - AIChE's Andreas Acrivos Award for Professional Progress in Chemical Engineering

References 

American bioengineers
American chemical engineers
Women chemical engineers
MIT School of Engineering alumni
UC Berkeley College of Chemistry alumni
MIT School of Engineering faculty
African-American scientists
Scientists from Cincinnati
Living people
21st-century American engineers
21st-century women engineers
21st-century chemists
Engineers from Ohio
Year of birth missing (living people)
21st-century African-American people